The Best of Bond... James Bond is the title of various compilation albums of music used in the James Bond films made by Eon Productions up to that time. The album was originally released in 1992 as The Best of James Bond, as a one-disc compilation and a two-disc 30th Anniversary Limited Edition compilation with songs that had, at that point, never been released to the public. The single disc compilation was later updated four times in 1999, 2002, 2008, and 2012. The 2008 version was augmented with the addition of a DVD featuring music videos and a documentary. Another two-disc edition, this time containing 50 tracks for the 50th anniversary of the franchise, was released in 2012.

30th Anniversary Collection

The 30th Anniversary Collection of The Best of James Bond was released in 1992. It featured 19 tracks including 16 title songs for the 16 films that had thus far been released.

Track listing 
 "James Bond Theme" by Monty Norman Orchestra
 "Goldfinger" by Shirley Bassey
 "Nobody Does It Better" by Carly Simon
 "A View to a Kill" by Duran Duran
 "Mr. Kiss Kiss Bang Bang" by Dionne Warwick
 "For Your Eyes Only" by Sheena Easton
 "We Have All the Time in the World" by Louis Armstrong
 "Live and Let Die" by Paul McCartney & Wings
 "All Time High" by Rita Coolidge
 "The Living Daylights" by a-ha
 "Licence to Kill" by Gladys Knight
 "From Russia with Love" by Matt Monro
 "Thunderball" by Tom Jones
 "You Only Live Twice" by Nancy Sinatra
 "Moonraker" by Shirley Bassey
 "On Her Majesty's Secret Service" by John Barry Orchestra
 "The Man with the Golden Gun" by Lulu
 "Diamonds Are Forever" by Shirley Bassey
 "007" by John Barry Orchestra

A limited 2-disc edition, released in the US only, reshuffles the tracks, sorting chronologically the 16 title songs on disc 1, the three remaining tracks appearing on disc 2. It also includes four tracks that were originally missing from Goldfingers soundtrack (US release), although these four were included in the remastered soundtrack for Goldfinger in 2003 and appeared on the British LP in the 1960s. The "Thunderball Suite", was likewise not released on the Thunderball soundtrack until it was split up and used on the remastered release in 2003, along with extra unreleased music.

Two rare additions were also made to the second disc. The first is the original version of "Goldfinger" sung by Anthony Newley who also wrote the song in collaboration with the film's composer, John Barry. Newley's jazz version was, however, replaced by Shirley Bassey's version in 1964 for the film and for release on the album. Newley's version was first released with the 30th Anniversary Collection. The second rare addition is Shirley Bassey's version of "Mr. Kiss Kiss Bang Bang" for Thunderball. Bassey had originally recorded the vocals for the track which initially was to be used as the main title theme; however, the song was replaced by Tom Jones' "Thunderball" after a decision by the producers that the title theme should feature the name of the film. Dionne Warwick was subsequently chosen to rerecord "Mr. Kiss Kiss Bang Bang", but even her version wasn't released on the Thunderball soundtrack till the 1990s.

Track listing (limited edition)

Disc one 
 "James Bond Theme" by Monty Norman Orchestra
 "From Russia with Love" by Matt Monro
 "Goldfinger" by Shirley Bassey
 "Thunderball" by Tom Jones
 "You Only Live Twice" by Nancy Sinatra
 "On Her Majesty's Secret Service" by John Barry Orchestra
 "Diamonds Are Forever" by Shirley Bassey
 "Live and Let Die" by Paul McCartney & Wings
 "The Man with the Golden Gun" by Lulu
 "Nobody Does It Better" by Carly Simon
 "Moonraker" by Shirley Bassey
 "For Your Eyes Only" by Sheena Easton
 "All Time High" by Rita Coolidge
 "A View to a Kill" by Duran Duran
 "The Living Daylights" by a-ha
 "Licence to Kill" by Gladys Knight

Disc two 
 "James Bond Theme" by John Barry Orchestra
 "007" by John Barry Orchestra
 "Goldfinger" by Anthony Newley (demo)
 "Pussy Galore's Flying Circus" John Barry (Goldfinger)
 "Golden Girl" by John Barry (Goldfinger)
 "Death of Tilley" by John Barry (Goldfinger)
 "The Laser Beam" by John Barry (Goldfinger)
 "Mr. Kiss Kiss Bang Bang" by Dionne Warwick
 "Thunderball Suite" by John Barry (Thunderball)
 "Mr. Kiss Kiss Bang Bang" by Shirley Bassey (original recording)
 "You Only Live Twice" by Julie Rogers (demo version)
 "You Only Live Twice" by (radio spot)
 "We Have All the Time in the World" by Louis Armstrong
 "Thunderball" by (radio spot)
 "Live and Let Die" by (radio spot)

1999 release

Track listing 
 "James Bond Theme" – John Barry & Orchestra
 "Goldfinger" – Shirley Bassey
 "Nobody Does It Better" – Carly Simon
 "A View to a Kill" – Duran Duran
 "For Your Eyes Only" – Sheena Easton
 "We Have All the Time in the World" – Louis Armstrong
 "Live and Let Die" – Paul McCartney & Wings
 "All Time High" – Rita Coolidge
 "The Living Daylights" – a-ha
 "Licence to Kill" – Gladys Knight
 "From Russia with Love" – Matt Monro
 "Thunderball" – Tom Jones
 "You Only Live Twice" – Nancy Sinatra
 "Moonraker" – Shirley Bassey
 "On Her Majesty's Secret Service" – John Barry & Orchestra
 "The Man with the Golden Gun" – Lulu
 "Diamonds Are Forever" – Shirley Bassey
 "GoldenEye" – Tina Turner
 "Tomorrow Never Dies" – Sheryl Crow

2002 release

Track listing 
 "James Bond Theme" – John Barry & Orchestra
 "Goldfinger" – Shirley Bassey
 "Nobody Does It Better" – Carly Simon
 "A View to a Kill" – Duran Duran
 "For Your Eyes Only" – Sheena Easton
 "We Have All the Time in the World" – Louis Armstrong
 "Live and Let Die" – Paul McCartney & Wings
 "All Time High" – Rita Coolidge
 "The Living Daylights" – a-ha
 "Licence to Kill" – Gladys Knight
 "From Russia with Love" – Matt Monro
 "Thunderball" – Tom Jones
 "You Only Live Twice" – Nancy Sinatra
 "Moonraker" – Shirley Bassey
 "On Her Majesty's Secret Service" – The John Barry Orchestra
 "The Man with the Golden Gun" – Lulu
 "Diamonds Are Forever" – Shirley Bassey
 "GoldenEye" – Tina Turner
 "Tomorrow Never Dies" – Sheryl Crow
 "The World Is Not Enough" – Garbage
 "James Bond Theme (Moby's Re-Version)" – Moby
 "James Bond Theme (GoldenEye Trailer Version) – Starr Parodi & Jeff Eden Fair (previously unreleased)

2008 release

Track listing

Disc one (CD) 
 "James Bond Theme" – John Barry & Orchestra
 "From Russia with Love" – Matt Monro
 "Goldfinger" – Shirley Bassey
 "Thunderball" – Tom Jones
 "You Only Live Twice" – Nancy Sinatra
 "On Her Majesty's Secret Service" – The John Barry Orchestra
 "We Have All the Time in the World" – Louis Armstrong
 "Diamonds Are Forever" – Shirley Bassey
 "Live and Let Die" – Paul McCartney & Wings
 "The Man with the Golden Gun" – Lulu
 "Nobody Does It Better" – Carly Simon
 "Moonraker" – Shirley Bassey
 "For Your Eyes Only" – Sheena Easton
 "All Time High" – Rita Coolidge
 "A View to a Kill" – Duran Duran
 "The Living Daylights" – a-ha
 "Licence to Kill" – Gladys Knight
 "GoldenEye" – Tina Turner
 "Tomorrow Never Dies" – Sheryl Crow
 "Surrender" – k.d. lang
 "The World Is Not Enough" – Garbage
 "Die Another Day" – Madonna
 "You Know My Name" – Chris Cornell
 "James Bond Theme" – John Arnold (Bonus Track, Previously Unreleased)

Disc two (DVD) 
 "A View to A Kill" – Duran Duran
 "For Your Eyes Only" – Sheena Easton
 "GoldenEye" – Tina Turner
 "The Living Daylights" – A-Ha
 "All Time High" – Rita Coolidge
 "Goldfinger" – Shirley Bassey (Live at Royal Albert Hall, 1974)
 Documentary: The Music of James Bond

2012 release 
Released to celebrate the 50th anniversary of the series, the 2012 release eschews the gun barrel sequence that served as the cover motif so far to instead feature the "Golden Girl" from Goldfinger. It was released in two versions, a two-disc edition with 50 tracks, and a single-disc edition with only the first CD, comprising 23 tracks.

Track listing

Disc one 
 "James Bond Theme" – John Barry Orchestra
 "From Russia with Love" – Matt Monro
 "Goldfinger" – Shirley Bassey
 "Thunderball" – Tom Jones
 "You Only Live Twice" – Nancy Sinatra
 "On Her Majesty's Secret Service" – John Barry Orchestra
 "We Have All the Time in the World" – Louis Armstrong
 "Diamonds Are Forever" – Shirley Bassey
 "Live and Let Die" – Paul McCartney & Wings
 "The Man with the Golden Gun" – Lulu
 "Nobody Does It Better" – Carly Simon
 "Moonraker" – Shirley Bassey
 "For Your Eyes Only" – Sheena Easton
 "All Time High" – Rita Coolidge
 "A View to a Kill" – Duran Duran
 "The Living Daylights" – a-ha
 "Licence to Kill" – Gladys Knight (film edit)
 "GoldenEye" – Tina Turner (film edit)
 "Tomorrow Never Dies" – Sheryl Crow
 "The World Is Not Enough" – Garbage
 "Die Another Day" – Madonna
 "You Know My Name" – Chris Cornell
 "Another Way to Die" – Jack White & Alicia Keys

Disc two 
 "Dr. No's Fantasy" – Monty Norman Orchestra
 "Under the Mango Tree" – Diana Coupland
 "007" – John Barry Orchestra
 "Opening Titles: James Bond Is Back/From Russia with Love/James Bond Theme" – John Barry Orchestra (From Russia with Love)
 "Into Miami" – John Barry Orchestra
 "The Laser Beam" – John Barry Orchestra
 "Mr. Kiss Kiss Bang Bang" – Shirley Bassey
 "Switching the Body" – John Barry Orchestra
 "Capsule in Space" – John Barry Orchestra
 "Do You Know How Christmas Trees Are Grown?" – Nina
 "Bond Smells a Rat" – John Barry Orchestra
 "Fillet of Soul – New Orleans/Live and Let Die/Fillet of Soul – Harlem" – George Martin Orchestra featuring B. J. Arnau
 "Underground Lair" – George Martin Orchestra
 "Hip's Trip" – John Barry Orchestra
 "The Pyramids" – Marvin Hamlisch
 "Cable Car and Snake Fight" – John Barry Orchestra
 "Make It Last All Night" – Bill Conti featuring Rage
 "The Chase Bomb Theme" – John Barry Orchestra
 "Snow Job" – John Barry Orchestra
 "Where Has Everybody Gone?" – The Pretenders (The Living Daylights)
 "If There Was a Man" – The Pretenders
 "The Experience of Love" – Éric Serra
 "James Bond Theme (Moby's Re-Version)" – Moby (Tomorrow Never Dies)
 "Surrender" – k.d. lang
 "Only Myself to Blame" – Scott Walker
 "Vesper" – David Arnold
 "Time to Get Out" – David Arnold

2021 Release 
Released to coincide with the release of No Time to Die, the packaging reverts back to the gun barrel design and it was released on 2-disc CD and 3-disc Vinyl.

Track Listing (CD)

Disc 1 
 "James Bond Theme" – John Barry Orchestra
 "From Russia with Love" – Matt Monro
 "Goldfinger" – Shirley Bassey
 "Thunderball" – Tom Jones
 "You Only Live Twice" – Nancy Sinatra
 "On Her Majesty's Secret Service" – John Barry Orchestra
 "We Have All the Time in the World" – Louis Armstrong
 "Diamonds Are Forever" – Shirley Bassey
 "Live and Let Die" – Paul McCartney & Wings
 "The Man with the Golden Gun" – Lulu
 "Nobody Does It Better" – Carly Simon
 "Moonraker" – Shirley Bassey
 "For Your Eyes Only" – Sheena Easton
 "All Time High" – Rita Coolidge

Disc 2 
 "A View to a Kill" – Duran Duran
 "The Living Daylights" – a-ha
 "Licence to Kill" – Gladys Knight (film edit)
 "GoldenEye" – Tina Turner (film edit)
 "Tomorrow Never Dies" – Sheryl Crow
 "The World Is Not Enough" – Garbage
 "Die Another Day" – Madonna
 "You Know My Name" – Chris Cornell
 "Another Way to Die" – Jack White & Alicia Keys
 "Skyfall" – Adele
 "Writing's on the Wall" – Sam Smith
 "No Time to Die" – Billie Eilish

Compilation catalog numbers 
 1992 cassette tape: EMI Records USA 0777 7 98413 4 9
 1992 single CD: EMI Records USA 0777 7 98413 2 5
 1992 double CD: EMI Records USA 07777 98560 2 2
 2002 CD: Capitol Records/MGM Music 72435-40554-2-3
 2008 CD: Capitol Records/MGM Music 50999 243352 25
 2012 single CD: Capitol Records/MGM Music 50999 232817 21
 2012 double CD: Capitol Records/MGM Music 50999 232818 20

See also 
 Outline of James Bond

References 

Soundtrack albums from James Bond films
Capitol Records soundtracks
1992 soundtrack albums
Soundtrack compilation albums